Asa Clapp (March 15, 1762 – April 17, 1848) was an American merchant and politician.

Personal
Clapp was born to Abiel Clapp, an established farmer and town magistrate in Mansfield, Massachusetts. In 1787, Clapp married Eliza Wendell Quincy (died 1853, age 90) of Boston. She was the daughter of prominent physician Jacob Quincy and granddaughter of Boston merchant Edmund Quincy. Clapp was one of Portland's largest merchants at the time of his death. Several of his sons were also major merchants and were elected to political offices; Charles Q. Clapp, for whom the still-standing Charles Q. Clapp House and Charles Q. Clapp Block are named, one of them.  Another son, Asa W. H. Clapp, represented Maine's 2nd congressional district in the 30th United States Congress (1847–1849).

Career
Clapp was appointed a non-commissioned officer for the colonists during the American Revolution. After the war, Clapp worked as a sailor. He was present in Port au Prince at the beginning of the Haitian Revolution. He and William McLellan were witnesses to the massacre of the white population in the revolution's early stages. Clapp and Joseph Peabody had assisted the white population against the formerly enslaved rebels. In 1793, Clapp was captured by British officials as part of the French Revolutionary Wars and detained in England for six months. He was eventually released and compensated for lost cargo. In 1796, he established himself as a merchant in Portland, Maine, which was then part of the state of Massachusetts. In December 1807, the U.S. Congress passed the Embargo Act of 1807, which forbid merchants like Clapp from trading abroad. Though disastrous to his financial interests and the New England shipping economy in general, Clapp supported the measure. In 1811, he served on the Massachusetts Governor's Council under Governor Elbridge Gerry. Clapp also supported the United States during the War of 1812 despite it severely hurting his business interests.

When the Second Bank of the United States was chartered during the presidency of James Madison, Clapp was the largest subscriber in the District of Maine and was appointed Commissioner, though he did not maintain interest in the Bank for very long.

A supporter of statehood, Clapp was a delegate to the October 1819 Maine statehood convention. After statehood was won, he served in the Maine House of Representatives from 1820–1823.

Clapp was a staunch Democrat and, at the age of 85 in 1847, briefly hosted President James K. Polk and Secretary of State James Buchanan during their visit to the city of Portland.

He died in Portland on April 17, 1848.

References

1762 births
1848 deaths
American businesspeople in shipping
People from Mansfield, Massachusetts
Businesspeople from Portland, Maine
Politicians from Portland, Maine
People of Massachusetts in the American Revolution
Members of the Massachusetts Governor's Council
Democratic Party members of the Maine House of Representatives